The 1977–78 SM-liiga season was the third season of the SM-liiga, the top level of ice hockey in Finland. 10 teams participated in the league, and Porin Ässät won the championship.

Standings

Playoffs

Semifinal
 Tappara - Ilves 3:1 (5:1, 3:1, 3:4 P, 6:2)
 Ässät - TPS 3:2 (2:4, 6:2, 8:1, 1:2, 3:1)

3rd place
 TPS - Ilves 2:1 (7:6, 2:4, 8:1)

Final
 Tappara - Ässät 1:3 (8:0, 2:3, 4:8, 3:6)

Relegation

External links
 SM-liiga official website

1977–78 in Finnish ice hockey
Fin
Liiga seasons